Hu Xuwei (born 25 February 1997) is a Chinese artistic gymnast. He competed in the 2019 Asian Artistic Gymnastics Championships in Ulaanbaatar, Mongolia, winning gold medals in both the team event and the Horizontal bar final and winning silver in the all-around and parallel bar finals. At the 2021 World Artistic Gymnastics Championships he qualified in third for the parallel bars event and second for the horizontal bar event. He went on to win both the Parallel Bar final and the Horizontal Bar final; becoming the first athlete to hold both bar titles in a single World Championship since Boris Shakhlin in the 1958 World Artistic Gymnastics Championships.

References 

1997 births
Living people
Chinese male artistic gymnasts
Gymnasts from Guangxi
Sportspeople from Guangxi
World champion gymnasts
Medalists at the World Artistic Gymnastics Championships
21st-century Chinese people